The Jewish History Museum, formerly known as the Jewish Heritage Center of the Southwest, is a museum housed in a historic synagogue building in Tucson, Arizona.  The museum's building, which housed the first synagogue in the Arizona Territory, is the oldest synagogue building in the state.

Stone Avenue Temple

The building is the original home of Temple Emanu-El ( Tucson), built in 1910.  The pioneer Jewish Women's organization, then called the Hebrew Benevolent Society were the individuals who lobbied for a permanent Jewish house of worship in the then Arizona Territory .  The historic synagogue is a brick structure designed by architect Ely Blount. Blount blended a pedimented, pilastered Greek revival facade with rounded windows and twin towers in Rundbogenstil style.  In 1937 the building's front facade was covered with stucco.  The original stained-glass windows have been lost.  The building is listed in on the National Register of Historic Places. Efforts to preserve the synagogue garnered national attention when it received the National Preservation Honor Award from the National Trust for Historic Preservation.

The Museum

The Museum was created in 2005 by the merger of the non-profit that was formed to rescue the building from destruction in 1998 - The Historic Stone Avenue Temple Project with the Jewish Historical Society of Southern Arizona.

In addition to its permanent collection, the Museum hosts exhibitions, lectures, the annual Ketubah and Antique wedding gown exhibit and the Jewish Storytelling Festival as well as is the home of the Jewish Arizona Oral History Project.

See also
 Temple Emanu-El (Tucson)
 Tucson Hebrew Academy

References

External links
 http://www.jewishhistorymuseum.org
David Leighton, "Street Smarts: Tucson veteran was among 1,000 children saved from Nazi Germany," Arizona Daily Star, May 13, 2014

2005 establishments in Arizona
Jewish museums in the United States
Museums established in 2005
Museums in Tucson, Arizona
Synagogues in Arizona
Synagogues preserved as museums
Synagogues on the National Register of Historic Places in Arizona
National Register of Historic Places in Tucson, Arizona